Kyril, Prince of Preslav, Duke in Saxony (born 11 July 1964), also known as Kyril of Saxe-Coburg, is the second son of Simeon II and Margarita Saxe-Coburg-Gotha. His father, Simeon, served as Tsar of Bulgaria from 1943 to 1946 and Prime Minister of Bulgaria from 2001 to 2005.

Education and career
Kyril was born in Madrid, and graduated from Princeton University with an A.B. in physics in 1986 after completing a senior thesis titled "Velocity distribution of pulsars: a Monte Carlo simulation."

In 2007, he worked for GLG Partners, the London-based asset management branch of Lehman Brothers.

Marriage and family
Kyril married María del Rosario Nadal y Fuster de Puigdórfila, who goes by "Rosario Nadal", on 15 September 1989. Her first cousin, Joaquín Felipe de Puigdórfila y Esteve is the current Count of Olocau.

The religious ceremony was held at Saint Anne's Chapel, Royal Palace of La Almudaina, Palma de Mallorca. The Spanish tabloids ¡Hola! and Semana covered the event and reported that there were 400 guests, though only 125 could be accommodated in the chapel for the religious ceremony. According to Majesty magazine at the time, King Juan Carlos, Queen Sofía, Infanta Elena, Infanta Cristina of Spain, and Felipe VI of Spain attended the occasion.

The couple have three children:
 Mafalda-Cecilia (born 27 July 1994). On 28 May 2022 married civilly Marc Abousleiman in Majorca.
 Olimpia (born 14 December 1995)
 Tassilo (born 20 January 2002)

A former model and muse for the fashion designer Valentino Garavani, Rosario Nadal works professionally as an art consultant. In 2007, she wrote an article for Architectural Digest.

In October 2009, it was announced by the Spanish news agency EFE that, according to a report from an anonymous source close to Simeon of Bulgaria, the couple were going to live separately. The source claimed, however, that they don't presently have any plans or intention to divorce.

The couple appeared together at the wedding of Victoria, Crown Princess of Sweden on 19 June 2010.

Personal life
On 28 October 1987, Kyril escorted fellow Princeton graduate Brooke Shields to a dinner/fashion show hosted by Christian Lacroix in New York City. Until his marriage, Kyril's purported romantic interests were tracked by European celebrity magazines, notably ¡Hola! in Spain.

He owns a vacation residence near Campos, Majorca, where he is a keen surfer.

He and his wife have been known to socialize with many celebrities and royalty, such as Gwyneth Paltrow, Hugh Grant, the Crown Prince Haakon Magnus and Mette Marit of Norway, as well as the Spanish royal family.

Kyril and his wife separated in 2009. Since 2017 he has been in a relationship with British businesswoman Katharine Butler.

He is the godfather of Prince Aristidis-Stavros of Greece and Denmark, son of Pavlos, Crown Prince of Greece.

Titles and honours
11 July 1964 – present: His Royal Highness Kyril, Prince of Preslav, Prince of Bulgaria, Prince of Saxe-Coburg and Gotha, Duke in Saxony

Dynastic honours
 Bulgarian royal family: Knight Grand Cross of the Order of Saint Alexander

Ancestors

Notes

1964 births
Living people
Nobility from Madrid
Bulgarian princes
Princes of Preslav
House of Saxe-Coburg and Gotha (Bulgaria)
Princeton University alumni
Eastern Orthodox Christians from Spain
Spanish people of Bulgarian descent
Sons of kings